Lipin Bor is a rural locality (a selo) and the administrative center of Vashkinsky District, Vologda Oblast, Russia, located on the northern shore of Lake Beloye. It also serves as the administrative center of Lipinoborsky Selsoviet, one of the twelve selsoviets into which the district is administratively divided. Municipally, it is the administrative center of Lipinoborskoye Rural Settlement. Population:

History
Lipin Bor was founded in 1938. The administrative center of Vashkinsky District was immediately transferred to Lipin Bor from the selo of Vashki.

Economy

Industry
In Lipin Bor, there are food industry and timber industry enterprises.

Transportation
There is a highway connecting Vologda and Vytegra which passes several kilometers from Lipin Bor. Another road branches off south, running via Lipin Bor to Belozersk. There are also local roads with bus traffic.

Lake Beloye is a part of the Volga–Baltic Waterway (formerly known as the Mariinsk Canal System), connecting the Rybinsk Reservoir in the river basin of the Volga and Lake Onega in the river basin of the Neva.

Culture and recreation
The Trinity Church (1792) in Lipin Bor has been designated as an architectural monument of local significance.

Vashkinsky District Museum is located in Lipin Bor.

References

Notes

Sources

Rural localities in Vashkinsky District
Novgorod Governorate